The Diocese of Ely is a Church of England diocese in the Province of Canterbury.  It is headed by the Bishop of Ely, who sits at Ely Cathedral in Ely.  There is one suffragan (subordinate) bishop, the Bishop of Huntingdon.  The diocese now covers the modern ceremonial county of Cambridgeshire (excluding the Soke of Peterborough) and western Norfolk. The diocese was created in 1109 out of part of the Diocese of Lincoln.

The diocese is ancient, and the area of Ely was part of the patrimony of Saint Etheldreda. A religious house was founded in the city in 673. After her death in 679 she was buried outside the church, and her remains were later reburied inside, the foundress being commemorated as a great Anglian saint.

The diocese has had its boundaries altered various times.  From an original diocese covering the historic county of Cambridgeshire and the Isle of Ely, Bedfordshire and Huntingdonshire were added in 1837 from the Diocese of Lincoln, as was the Sudbury archdeaconry in Suffolk from the Diocese of Norwich.  In 1914 Bedfordshire became part of the Diocese of St Albans, and western Suffolk became part of the Diocese of St Edmundsbury and Ipswich, whilst Ely took a western part of the Diocese of Norwich.  Peterborough remains the seat of the Diocese of Peterborough.

It has a population of 705,000 and comprises 209 benefices, 303 parishes and 335 churches with 145 stipendiary parochial clergy.

Bishops
The diocesan Bishop of Ely (Stephen Conway) is assisted by a Bishop suffragan of Huntingdon (Dagmar Winter).

There are also four retired bishops living in the diocese who are licensed as honorary assistant bishops:
1995–present: Peter Dawes, retired Bishop of Derby, lives in Ely itself.
2011–present: Lindsay Urwin. Former Area Bishop of Horsham. At present, he is a parish priest in the Anglican Diocese of Melbourne.
2012–present: Retired Dean of St Paul's and former Bishop of Sodor and Man Graeme Knowles lives in Bury St Edmunds (in neighbouring Eds & Ips diocese.)
2013–present: John Flack, retired Director of the Anglican Centre in Rome & Archbishop's Representative to the Holy See and former Bishop of Huntingdon, lives in Whittlesey.
2020–present: Graham Kings, former Bishop of Sherborne.

Alternative episcopal oversight (for parishes in the diocese which reject the ministry of women priests and bishops) is provided by the provincial episcopal visitor, Norman Banks, Bishop suffragan of Richborough, who is licensed as an honorary assistant bishop of the diocese to facilitate his work there.

The Bishop of Peterborough has also been commissioned as assistant bishop in the diocese so that he can exercise pastoral care in several old Huntingdonshire parishes now within the Peterborough unitary authority: including Stanground, Orton, Woodston, Yaxley and Fletton.

Archdeaconries and deaneries 

The archdeaconry of Wisbech was active from 1915 to 2005. The following changes to deaneries have taken place:

 the deaneries of Fordham and Quy merged in 2002 to form the deanery of Fordham and Quy
 the deaneries of Wisbech and Lynn Marshland merged in 2002 to form the deanery of Wisbech Lynn Marshland
 the deaneries of Fincham and Feltwell were merged in 2004 to form the deanery of Fincham and Feltwell.
the deaneries of Shelford and Linton were merged in 2009 to form the deanery of Granta.
the deanery of Cambridge was split in 2006 into the deaneries of Cambridge North and Cambridge South.
the deanery of Leightonstone was merged into the deanery of Huntingdon in 2004.

*including Cathedral and St Peter's Ely

Churches

Outside deanery structures

Bourn Deanery

Closed churches in this area

Cambridge North Deanery

Churches in this area no longer used for regular worship

Cambridge South Deanery

Churches in this area no longer used for regular worship

Ely Deanery

Closed churches in the area

Fincham and Feltwell Deanery

Closed churches in the area

Fordham and Quy Deanery

Closed churches in this area

Granta Deanery

Closed churches in this area

Huntingdon Deanery

Closed churches in the area

March Deanery

North Stowe Deanery

Closed churches in this area

St Ives Deanery

Closed churches in the area

St Neots Deanery

Closed churches in this area

Shingay Deanery

Wisbech Lynn Marshland Deanery

Closed churches in this area

Yaxley Deanery

Closed churches in this area

Dedications 
This table is drawn from the above lists.

Posts occupied by Church of England clergy within the area of the diocese

Diocesan news publications

See also

Lands and Liberties of the Church at Ely

References

External links
 
 Church of England Statistics 2002 
 Summary diocesan statistics 2008/09

 
1109 establishments in England
Ely
Ely, Cambridgeshire